Phyllonorycter millierella is a moth of the family Gracillariidae. It is found in southern Europe, including Spain, France, Switzerland, Italy, Croatia, Bulgaria, North Macedonia and Greece.

The larvae feed on Celtis australis. They mine the leaves of their host plant. They create a lower surface tentiform mine without clear folds. The lower epidermis is silvery grey and densely mottled with rusty brown or dark grey specks. At the upperside the mine forms a blister, which is discoloured except for the green centre. There may be several mines in a single leaf. Pupation takes place within the mine.

External links
bladmineerders.nl
Fauna Europaea

millierella
Moths of Europe
Moths described in 1871